Morgan O'Brien may refer to:
 Morgan O'Brien (American football), American engineer and National Football League founder
 Morgan E. O'Brien (born 1944), American wireless telecommunications pioneer
 Morgan J. O'Brien (1852–1937), American lawyer and judge